This is a list of high schools in Washington, D.C.

High Schools

Map of High Schools
{
  "type": "FeatureCollection",
  "features": [
    {
      "type": "Feature",
      "geometry": {
        "type": "Point",
        "coordinates": [
          -76.982326,
          38.870618
        ]
      },
      "properties": {
        "title": "Anacostia High School",
        "marker-color": "#0000FF",
        "Neighborhood": "Anacostia",
        "Ward": 8,
        "DCPS School Code": 450,
        "Address": "1601 16th St SE, Washington, DC 20020"
      }
    },
    {
      "type": "Feature",
      "geometry": {
        "type": "Point",
        "coordinates": [
          -77.000676,
          38.84027
        ]
      },
      "properties": {
        "title": "Ballou High School",
        "marker-color": "#0000FF",
        "Neighborhood": "Congress Heights",
        "Ward": 8,
        "DCPS School Code": 452,
        "Address": "3401 4th St SE, Washington, DC 20032"
      }
    },
    {
      "type": "Feature",
      "geometry": {
        "type": "Point",
        "coordinates": [
          -77.0195784,
          38.9672842
        ]
      },
      "properties": {
        "title": "Calvin Coolidge High School",
        "marker-color": "#0000FF",
        "Neighborhood": "Takoma",
        "Ward": 4,
        "DCPS School Code": 455,
        "Address": "6315 5th St NW, Washington, DC 20011"
      }
    },
    {
      "type": "Feature",
      "geometry": {
        "type": "Point",
        "coordinates": [
          -77.0284,
          38.92194525
        ]
      },
      "properties": {
        "title": "Cardozo Education Campus",
        "marker-color": "#0000FF",
        "Neighborhood": "Columbia Heights",
        "Ward": 1,
        "DCPS School Code": 442,
        "Address": "1200 Clifton St NW, Washington, DC 20009"
      }
    },
    {
      "type": "Feature",
      "geometry": {
        "type": "Point",
        "coordinates": [
          -77.012407,
          38.914232
        ]
      },
      "properties": {
        "title": "Dunbar High School",
        "marker-color": "#0000FF",
        "Neighborhood": "Truxton Circle",
        "Ward": 5,
        "DCPS School Code": 467,
        "Address": "101 N St NW, Washington, DC 20001"
      }
    },
    {
      "type": "Feature",
      "geometry": {
        "type": "Point",
        "coordinates": [
          -76.979687,
          38.89041
        ]
      },
      "properties": {
        "title": "Eastern High School",
        "marker-color": "#0000FF",
        "Neighborhood": "Kingman Park",
        "Ward": 7,
        "DCPS School Code": 457,
        "Address": "1700 East Capitol St NE, Washington, DC 20002"
      }
    },
    {
      "type": "Feature",
      "geometry": {
        "type": "Point",
        "coordinates": [
          -76.92199513,
          38.89637511
        ]
      },
      "properties": {
        "title": "H.D. Woodson Senior High School",
        "marker-color": "#0000FF",
        "Neighborhood": "Northeast Boundary",
        "Ward": 7,
        "DCPS School Code": 464,
        "Address": "540 55th St NE, Washington, DC 20019"
      }
    },
    {
      "type": "Feature",
      "geometry": {
        "type": "Point",
        "coordinates": [
          -77.029595,
          38.94297825
        ]
      },
      "properties": {
        "title": "Theodore Roosevelt High School",
        "marker-color": "#0000FF",
        "Neighborhood": "Petworth",
        "Ward": 4,
        "DCPS School Code": 459,
        "Address": "4301 13th St NW, Washington, DC 20011"
      }
    },
    {
      "type": "Feature",
      "geometry": {
        "type": "Point",
        "coordinates": [
          -77.0777757,
          38.9501564
        ]
      },
      "properties": {
        "title": "Jackson-Reed High School",
        "marker-color": "#0000FF",
        "Neighborhood": "Tenleytown",
        "Ward": 3,
        "DCPS School Code": 463,
        "Address": "3950 Chesapeake St NW, Washington, DC 20016"
      }
    },
    {
      "type": "Feature",
      "geometry": {
        "type": "Point",
        "coordinates": [
          -77.02407,
          38.911807
        ]
      },
      "properties": {
        "title": "Benjamin Banneker Academic High School",
        "marker-color": "#FFFF00",
        "Neighborhood": "Shaw",
        "Ward": 1,
        "DCPS School Code": 402,
        "Address": "1600 9th St NW, Washington, DC 20001"
      }
    },
    {
      "type": "Feature",
      "geometry": {
        "type": "Point",
        "coordinates": [
          -77.03636667,
          38.92884867
        ]
      },
      "properties": {
        "title": "Bell Multicultural High School",
        "marker-color": "#FFFF00",
        "Neighborhood": "Columbia Heights",
        "Ward": 1,
        "DCPS School Code": null,
        "Address": "3105 16th St NW, Washington, DC 20010"
      }
    },
    {
      "type": "Feature",
      "geometry": {
        "type": "Point",
        "coordinates": [
          -77.0703076,
          38.913446
        ]
      },
      "properties": {
        "title": "Duke Ellington School of the Arts",
        "marker-color": "#FFFF00",
        "Neighborhood": "Burleith",
        "Ward": 2,
        "DCPS School Code": 471,
        "Address": "3500 R St NW, Washington, DC 20007"
      }
    },
    {
      "type": "Feature",
      "geometry": {
        "type": "Point",
        "coordinates": [
          -77.004929,
          38.915482
        ]
      },
      "properties": {
        "title": "McKinley Technology High School",
        "marker-color": "#FFFF00",
        "Neighborhood": "Eckington",
        "Ward": 5,
        "DCPS School Code": 435,
        "Address": "151 T St NE, Washington, DC 20002"
      }
    },
    {
      "type": "Feature",
      "geometry": {
        "type": "Point",
        "coordinates": [
          -76.9718976,
          38.9019917
        ]
      },
      "properties": {
        "title": "Phelps Architecture, Construction and Engineering High School",
        "marker-color": "#FFFF00",
        "Neighborhood": "Carver Langston",
        "Ward": 6,
        "DCPS School Code": 478,
        "Address": "704 26th St NE, Washington, DC 20002"
      }
    },
    {
      "type": "Feature",
      "geometry": {
        "type": "Point",
        "coordinates": [
          -77.04738324,
          38.89824006
        ]
      },
      "properties": {
        "title": "School Without Walls High School",
        "marker-color": "#FFFF00",
        "Neighborhood": "Foggy Bottom",
        "Ward": 2,
        "DCPS School Code": 466,
        "Address": "2130 G St NW, Washington, DC 20037"
      }
    },
    {
      "type": "Feature",
      "geometry": {
        "type": "Point",
        "coordinates": [
          -77.0365601,
          38.93088133
        ]
      },
      "properties": {
        "title": "YouthBuild Public Charter School",
        "marker-color": "#FFA500",
        "Neighborhood": "Mount Pleasant",
        "Ward": 1,
        "DCPS School Code": null,
        "Address": "3220 16th St. NW Washington, DC 20010"
      }
    },
    {
      "type": "Feature",
      "geometry": {
        "type": "Point",
        "coordinates": [
          -77.0681265,
          38.91633876
        ]
      },
      "properties": {
        "title": "British International School of Washington",
        "marker-color": "#FFA500",
        "Neighborhood": "Georgetown",
        "Ward": 2,
        "DCPS School Code": null,
        "Address": "2001 Wisconsin Ave NW, Washington, DC 20007"
      }
    },
    {
      "type": "Feature",
      "geometry": {
        "type": "Point",
        "coordinates": [
          -77.06919727,
          38.9090214
        ]
      },
      "properties": {
        "title": "Georgetown Visitation Preparatory School",
        "marker-color": "#FFA500",
        "Neighborhood": "Georgetown",
        "Ward": 2,
        "DCPS School Code": null,
        "Address": "1524 35th St NW, Washington, DC 20007"
      }
    },
    {
      "type": "Feature",
      "geometry": {
        "type": "Point",
        "coordinates": [
          -77.02306559,
          38.89501
        ]
      },
      "properties": {
        "title": "BASIS Washington DC",
        "marker-color": "#00FF00",
        "Neighborhood": "Penn Quarter",
        "Ward": 3,
        "DCPS School Code": null,
        "Address": "410 8th St NW, Washington, DC 20004"
      }
    },
    {
      "type": "Feature",
      "geometry": {
        "type": "Point",
        "coordinates": [
          -77.062229,
          38.942163
        ]
      },
      "properties": {
        "title": "Edmund Burke School",
        "marker-color": "#FFA500",
        "Neighborhood": "Forest Hills",
        "Ward": 3,
        "DCPS School Code": null,
        "Address": "4101 Connecticut Ave NW, Washington, DC 20008"
      }
    },
    {
      "type": "Feature",
      "geometry": {
        "type": "Point",
        "coordinates": [
          -77.0884198,
          38.9211473
        ]
      },
      "properties": {
        "title": "The Field School",
        "marker-color": "#FFA500",
        "Neighborhood": "Foxhall Crescent",
        "Ward": 3,
        "DCPS School Code": null,
        "Address": "2301 Foxhall Rd NW, Washington, DC 20007"
      }
    },
    {
      "type": "Feature",
      "geometry": {
        "type": "Point",
        "coordinates": [
          -77.09248153,
          38.91548115
        ]
      },
      "properties": {
        "title": "Lab School of Washington",
        "marker-color": "#FFA500",
        "Neighborhood": "Foxhall Village",
        "Ward": 3,
        "DCPS School Code": null,
        "Address": "4759 Reservoir Rd NW, Washington, DC 20007"
      }
    },
    {
      "type": "Feature",
      "geometry": {
        "type": "Point",
        "coordinates": [
          -77.06072598,
          38.9282028
        ]
      },
      "properties": {
        "title": "Maret School",
        "marker-color": "#FFA500",
        "Neighborhood": "Cleveland Park",
        "Ward": 3,
        "DCPS School Code": null,
        "Address": "3000 Cathedral Ave NW, Washington, DC 20008"
      }
    },
    {
      "type": "Feature",
      "geometry": {
        "type": "Point",
        "coordinates": [
          -77.07121949,
          38.93169154
        ]
      },
      "properties": {
        "title": "National Cathedral School",
        "marker-color": "#FFA500",
        "Neighborhood": "McLean Gardens",
        "Ward": 3,
        "DCPS School Code": null,
        "Address": "3612 Woodley Rd NW, Washington, DC 20016"
      }
    },
    {
      "type": "Feature",
      "geometry": {
        "type": "Point",
        "coordinates": [
          -77.07329155,
          38.92400983
        ]
      },
      "properties": {
        "title": "Russian Embassy School in Washington, D.C.",
        "marker-color": "#FFA500",
        "Neighborhood": "Massachusetts Avenue Heights",
        "Ward": 3,
        "DCPS School Code": null,
        "Address": "2650 Wisconsin Ave NW, Washington, DC 20007"
      }
    },
    {
      "type": "Feature",
      "geometry": {
        "type": "Point",
        "coordinates": [
          -77.072901,
          38.929625
        ]
      },
      "properties": {
        "title": "St. Albans School",
        "marker-color": "#FFA500",
        "Neighborhood": "Massachusetts Avenue Heights",
        "Ward": 3,
        "DCPS School Code": null,
        "Address": "3001 Wisconsin Ave NW, Washington, DC 20016"
      }
    },
    {
      "type": "Feature",
      "geometry": {
        "type": "Point",
        "coordinates": [
          -77.05582525,
          38.96408195
        ]
      },
      "properties": {
        "title": "St. John's College High School",
        "marker-color": "#FFA500",
        "Neighborhood": "Chevy Chase",
        "Ward": 3,
        "DCPS School Code": null,
        "Address": "2607 Military Rd NW, Washington, DC 20015"
      }
    },
    {
      "type": "Feature",
      "geometry": {
        "type": "Point",
        "coordinates": [
          -77.074002,
          38.939402
        ]
      },
      "properties": {
        "title": "Sidwell Friends School",
        "marker-color": "#FFA500",
        "Neighborhood": "McLean Gardens",
        "Ward": 3,
        "DCPS School Code": null,
        "Address": "3825 Wisconsin Ave, Washington, DC 20016"
      }
    },
    {
      "type": "Feature",
      "geometry": {
        "type": "Point",
        "coordinates": [
          -77.06203705,
          38.93341063
        ]
      },
      "properties": {
        "title": "Washington International School",
        "marker-color": "#FFA500",
        "Neighborhood": "Cleveland Park",
        "Ward": 3,
        "DCPS School Code": null,
        "Address": "3100 Macomb St NW, Washington, DC 20008"
      }
    },
    {
      "type": "Feature",
      "geometry": {
        "type": "Point",
        "coordinates": [
          -77.0828838,
          38.952932
        ]
      },
      "properties": {
        "title": "Georgetown Day School",
        "marker-color": "#FFA500",
        "Neighborhood": "Tenleytown",
        "Ward": 3,
        "DCPS School Code": null,
        "Address": "4200 Davenport St NW, Washington, DC 20016"
      }
    },
    {
      "type": "Feature",
      "geometry": {
        "type": "Point",
        "coordinates": [
          -77.01294177,
          38.96216785
        ]
      },
      "properties": {
        "title": "Capital City Public Charter School",
        "marker-color": "#00FF00",
        "Neighborhood": "Manor Park",
        "Ward": 4,
        "DCPS School Code": null,
        "Address": "100 Peabody St NW, Washington, DC 20011"
      }
    },
    {
      "type": "Feature",
      "geometry": {
        "type": "Point",
        "coordinates": [
          -77.034178,
          38.973643
        ]
      },
      "properties": {
        "title": "DC International School",
        "marker-color": "#00FF00",
        "Neighborhood": "Takoma",
        "Ward": 4,
        "DCPS School Code": null,
        "Address": "1400 Main Dr NW, Washington, DC 20012"
      }
    },
    {
      "type": "Feature",
      "geometry": {
        "type": "Point",
        "coordinates": [
          -77.036521,
          38.949862
        ]
      },
      "properties": {
        "title": "Parkmont School",
        "marker-color": "#FFA500",
        "Neighborhood": "16th Street Heights",
        "Ward": 4,
        "DCPS School Code": null,
        "Address": "4842 16th St NW, Washington, DC 20011"
      }
    },
    {
      "type": "Feature",
      "geometry": {
        "type": "Point",
        "coordinates": [
          -77.013618,
          38.953443
        ]
      },
      "properties": {
        "title": "Washington Latin Public Charter School",
        "marker-color": "#00FF00",
        "Neighborhood": "Brightwood Park",
        "Ward": 4,
        "DCPS School Code": null,
        "Address": "5200 2nd St NW, Washington, DC 20011"
      }
    },
    {
      "type": "Feature",
      "geometry": {
        "type": "Point",
        "coordinates": [
          -76.99220989,
          38.9321758
        ]
      },
      "properties": {
        "title": "Luke C. Moore Opportunity Academy",
        "marker-color": "#FFA500",
        "Neighborhood": "Brookland",
        "Ward": 5,
        "DCPS School Code": null,
        "Address": "1001 Monroe St NE, Washington, DC 20017"
      }
    },
    {
      "type": "Feature",
      "geometry": {
        "type": "Point",
        "coordinates": [
          -76.9785955,
          38.9367961
        ]
      },
      "properties": {
        "title": "Perry Street Prep",
        "marker-color": "#FFA500",
        "Neighborhood": "Woodridge",
        "Ward": 5,
        "DCPS School Code": null,
        "Address": "1800 Perry St NE, Washington, DC 20018"
      }
    },
    {
      "type": "Feature",
      "geometry": {
        "type": "Point",
        "coordinates": [
          -76.98557,
          38.94439
        ]
      },
      "properties": {
        "title": "St. Anselm's Abbey School",
        "marker-color": "#FFA500",
        "Neighborhood": "Michigan Park",
        "Ward": 5,
        "DCPS School Code": null,
        "Address": "4501 South Dakota Ave NE, Washington, DC 20017"
      }
    },
    {
      "type": "Feature",
      "geometry": {
        "type": "Point",
        "coordinates": [
          -77.00960757,
          38.90139573
        ]
      },
      "properties": {
        "title": "Gonzaga College High School",
        "marker-color": "#FFA500",
        "Neighborhood": "Near Northeast",
        "Ward": 6,
        "DCPS School Code": null,
        "Address": "19 I St NW, Washington, DC 20001"
      }
    },
    {
      "type": "Feature",
      "geometry": {
        "type": "Point",
        "coordinates": [
          -76.99557766,
          38.90962774
        ]
      },
      "properties": {
        "title": "KIPP DC College Preparatory",
        "marker-color": "#00FF00",
        "Neighborhood": "NoMa",
        "Ward": 6,
        "DCPS School Code": null,
        "Address": "1405 Brentwood Pkwy NE, Washington, DC 20002"
      }
    },
    {
      "type": "Feature",
      "geometry": {
        "type": "Point",
        "coordinates": [
          -77.01846888,
          38.88401085
        ]
      },
      "properties": {
        "title": "Richard Wright Public Charter School",
        "marker-color": "#00FF00",
        "Neighborhood": "Southwest Federal Center",
        "Ward": 6,
        "DCPS School Code": null,
        "Address": "475 School St SW, Washington, DC 20024"
      }
    },
    {
      "type": "Feature",
      "geometry": {
        "type": "Point",
        "coordinates": [
          -76.95143109,
          38.90424342
        ]
      },
      "properties": {
        "title": "Cesar Chavez Public Charter Schools for Public Policy",
        "marker-color": "#00FF00",
        "Neighborhood": "Mayfair",
        "Ward": 7,
        "DCPS School Code": null,
        "Address": "3701 Hayes St NE, Washington, DC 20019"
      }
    },
    {
      "type": "Feature",
      "geometry": {
        "type": "Point",
        "coordinates": [
          -76.9371036,
          38.9045486
        ]
      },
      "properties": {
        "title": "IDEA Public Charter School",
        "marker-color": "#00FF00",
        "Neighborhood": "Deanwood",
        "Ward": 7,
        "DCPS School Code": null,
        "Address": "1027 45th St NE, Washington, DC 20019"
      }
    },
    {
      "type": "Feature",
      "geometry": {
        "type": "Point",
        "coordinates": [
          -76.92032883,
          38.8903347
        ]
      },
      "properties": {
        "title": "Maya Angelou Public Charter School",
        "marker-color": "#00FF00",
        "Neighborhood": "Capitol View",
        "Ward": 7,
        "DCPS School Code": null,
        "Address": "5600 East Capitol St NE, Washington, DC 20019"
      }
    },
    {
      "type": "Feature",
      "geometry": {
        "type": "Point",
        "coordinates": [
          -76.99283244,
          38.86254579
        ]
      },
      "properties": {
        "title": "Thurgood Marshall Academy",
        "marker-color": "#00FF00",
        "Neighborhood": "Barry Farm",
        "Ward": 8,
        "DCPS School Code": null,
        "Address": "2427 Martin Luther King Jr Ave SE, Washington, DC 20020"
      }
    },
    {
      "type": "Feature",
      "geometry": {
        "type": "Point",
        "coordinates": [
          -76.995094,
          38.8323809
        ]
      },
      "properties": {
        "title": "KIPP DC Legacy College Preparatory",
        "marker-color": "#00FF00",
        "Neighborhood": "Washington Highlands",
        "Ward": 8,
        "DCPS School Code": null,
        "Address": "3999 8th St SE, Washington, DC 20032"
      }
    },
    {
      "type": "Feature",
      "geometry": {
        "type": "Point",
        "coordinates": [
          -76.99065459,
          38.88070355
        ]
      },
      "properties": {
        "title": "Digital Pioneers Academy",
        "marker-color": "#00FF00",
        "Neighborhood": "Capitol Hill",
        "Ward": 6,
        "DCPS School Code": null,
        "Address": "709 12th St SE, Washington, DC 20003"
      }
    },
    {
      "type": "Feature",
      "geometry": {
        "type": "Point",
        "coordinates": [
          -77.023329,
          38.945216
        ]
      },
      "properties": {
        "title": "E.L. Haynes Public Charter School",
        "marker-color": "#00FF00",
        "Neighborhood": "Petworth",
        "Ward": 4,
        "DCPS School Code": null,
        "Address": "4501 Kansas Ave NW, Washington, DC 20011"
      }
    },
    {
      "type": "Feature",
      "geometry": {
        "type": "Point",
        "coordinates": [
          -76.94552854,
          38.89756975
        ]
      },
      "properties": {
        "title": "Friendship Public Charter School - Collegiate Academy",
        "marker-color": "#00FF00",
        "Neighborhood": "Central Northeast",
        "Ward": 7,
        "DCPS School Code": null,
        "Address": "4095 Minnesota Ave NE, Washington, DC 20019"
      }
    },
    {
      "type": "Feature",
      "geometry": {
        "type": "Point",
        "coordinates": [
          -76.99607067,
          38.84919533
        ]
      },
      "properties": {
        "title": "Friendship Public Charter School - Technology Preparatory Academy High",
        "marker-color": "#00FF00",
        "Neighborhood": "Congress Heights",
        "Ward": 8,
        "DCPS School Code": null,
        "Address": "2705 Martin Luther King Jr Ave SE, Washington, DC 20032"
      }
    },
    {
      "type": "Feature",
      "geometry": {
        "type": "Point",
        "coordinates": [
          -77.02283026,
          38.89894311
        ]
      },
      "properties": {
        "title": "Girls Global Academy Public Charter School",
        "marker-color": "#00FF00",
        "Neighborhood": "Penn Quarter",
        "Ward": 2,
        "DCPS School Code": null,
        "Address": "733 8th St NW, Washington, DC 20001"
      }
    },
    {
      "type": "Feature",
      "geometry": {
        "type": "Point",
        "coordinates": [
          -77.04111087,
          38.898233
        ]
      },
      "properties": {
        "title": "Goodwill Excel Center Public Charter School",
        "marker-color": "#00FF00",
        "Neighborhood": "Foggy Bottom",
        "Ward": 2,
        "DCPS School Code": null,
        "Address": "1776 G St NW, Washington, DC 20006"
      }
    },
    {
      "type": "Feature",
      "geometry": {
        "type": "Point",
        "coordinates": [
          -76.98640875,
          38.89566335
        ]
      },
      "properties": {
        "title": "Kingsman Academy Public Charter School",
        "marker-color": "#00FF00",
        "Neighborhood": "Kingman Park",
        "Ward": 6,
        "DCPS School Code": null,
        "Address": "1375 E St NE, Washington, DC 20002"
      }
    },
    {
      "type": "Feature",
      "geometry": {
        "type": "Point",
        "coordinates": [
          -77.0247231,
          38.9613651
        ]
      },
      "properties": {
        "title": "Paul Public Charter School - International School",
        "marker-color": "#00FF00",
        "Neighborhood": "Brightwood",
        "Ward": 4,
        "DCPS School Code": null,
        "Address": "5800 8th St NW, Washington, DC 20011"
      }
    },
    {
      "type": "Feature",
      "geometry": {
        "type": "Point",
        "coordinates": [
          -76.94582009,
          38.8865943
        ]
      },
      "properties": {
        "title": "SEED Public Charter School",
        "marker-color": "#00FF00",
        "Neighborhood": "Fort Dupont",
        "Ward": 7,
        "DCPS School Code": null,
        "Address": "4300 C St SE, Washington, DC 20019"
      }
    },
    {
      "type": "Feature",
      "geometry": {
        "type": "Point",
        "coordinates": [
          -76.977094,
          38.887508
        ]
      },
      "properties": {
        "title": "St. Coletta Special Education Public Charter School",
        "marker-color": "#00FF00",
        "Neighborhood": "Barney Circle",
        "Ward": 7,
        "DCPS School Code": null,
        "Address": "1901 Independence Ave SE, Washington, DC 20003"
      }
    },

   {
      "type": "Feature",
      "geometry": {
        "type": "Point",
        "coordinates": [
          -77.002899,
          38.941891
        ]
      },
      "properties": {
        "title": "Archbishop Carroll High School",
         "marker-color": "#FFA500",
      }
    },
    {
      "type": "Feature",
      "geometry": {
        "type": "Point",
        "coordinates": [
          -76.9986698,
          38.9278646
        ]
      },
      "properties": {
        "title": "Washington Leadership Academy Public Charter School",
        "marker-color": "#00FF00",
        "Neighborhood": "Edgewood",
        "Ward": 5,
        "DCPS School Code": null,
        "Address": "3015 4th St NE, Washington, DC 20017"
      }
    }
  ]
}

Closed high schools 

 Associates for Renewal in Education Public Charter School
 Jos-Arz Academy Public Charter
 Kamit Institute Public Charter
 Kingsbury Day School
 Margaret Murray Washington School
 Washington Metropolitan High School
 Spingarn High School
 Emerson Preparatory School

References

External links 
List of high schools in the District of Columbia from SchoolTree.org
https://dcpcsb.org/school-profiles

Images

 
District of Columbia
High schools